Pamman (28 February 1920 – 3 June 2007; born R. Parmeswara Menon) was a Malayalam novelist from Kollam, Kerala, India.

Life
He is best known for his novels which grapple with the sensual imagery of the human psyche. He has also written the script for several Malayalam movies. Some of his novels were made into films, including Chattakari and Adimakal.  He won the Kerala State Film Award twice. He was employed as a General Manager for Western Railway and was based in Bombay.

Works
His works include:

Bhraanthu
Chattakari
Adimakal
Missi
Thamburatti
Ammini Ammavan
Nerippodu
Orumbattaval
Appu
Vashalan
Samaram
Chakravatham
Devagandhari
Karppoorathulasiyude Manam
Chathurangam
Paapamoksham
Karmmayogi
Ashtamathil Shani
Poochakkannulla Pennungal
Odukkam
Vazhi Pizhachavar
Panchavatiyile Gandharvam
Sister
Nirbhagyajaathakam
Thiranottam
Kuttasammatham
Ezhunnallathu-stories
Orupidi Nizhalukal

References

1920 births
2007 deaths
Indian male novelists
Malayalam novelists
Malayalam screenwriters
Writers from Kollam
20th-century Indian novelists
Screenwriters from Kerala
Novelists from Kerala
20th-century Indian male writers
20th-century Indian screenwriters